Gurgen Mikayeli Boryan (20 June 1915 – 15 April 1971), was an Armenian poet and playwright.

Biography 

Boryan was born in Shusha. He started his career of writer in 1930, and published his first collection of poems in 1937. He was the author of several poetry collections - "The way to the sea" (1940), "Selected works" (1953), "Poems" (1954); poetry for children ("Yes and no", 1955), "Under the same roof" (1957), "House on the roads" plays produced by Sundukian Theatre of Yerevan. He died in Yerevan.

"Saroyan brothers" film by Armenfilm is based on Boryan's well-known play.

References

1915 births
1971 deaths
20th-century Armenian dramatists and playwrights
20th-century Armenian poets
20th-century Armenian writers
Writers from Shusha
Communist Party of the Soviet Union members
Recipients of the Order of the Red Banner of Labour
Recipients of the Order of the Red Star
Armenian dramatists and playwrights
Armenian male writers
Armenian poets
Armenian-language poets
Maxim Gorky Literature Institute alumni